
Year 251 BC was a year of the pre-Julian Roman calendar. At the time it was known as the Year of the Consulship of Metellus and Pacilus (or, less frequently, year 503 Ab urbe condita). The denomination 251 BC for this year has been used since the early medieval period, when the Anno Domini calendar era became the prevalent method in Europe for naming years.

Events 
 By place 
 Greece 
 Paseas, the tyrant of the Greek city-state of Sicyon, is assassinated by Nicocles, with the acquiescence of the Macedonian king Antigonus II. Nicocles reigns as tyrant of Sicyon for only four months, during which period he drives into exile eighty of the city's citizens. Then the citadel of Sicyon is surprised in the night by a party of Sicyonian exiles, headed by a young nobleman, Aratus. The palace of the tyrant is set on fire, but Nicocles escapes from the city through a subterranean passage.
 Aratus recalls back to Sicyon those exiled by Nicocles. This leads to confusion and division within the city. Fearing that Antigonus II will exploit these divisions to attack the city, Aratus applies for the city to join the Achaean League, a league of a few small Achaean towns in the Peloponnese. Aratus then gains the financial support of the Egyptian king Ptolemy II to enable the Achaean League to defend itself against Macedonia.

 Roman Republic 
 The Romans, led by Lucius Caecilius Metellus, attack the Carthaginian held port city of Panormus after taking Kephalodon. After fierce fighting in the Battle of Panormus, the Carthaginians, led by Hasdrubal (the Fair), are defeated and the city falls.
 With Panormus captured, much of western inland Sicily falls with it. The cities of Ieta, Solous, Petra and Tyndaris agree to peace with the Romans in the same year. This defeat marks the end of significant Carthaginian land-based campaigning in Sicily.

 China 
 The Zhao general Lian Po wins a decisive victory in battle over the State of Yan at Hao. He is promoted to Prime Minister following the death of Lord Pingyuan.

Births

Deaths 
 Paseas, Greek tyrant of Sicyon (assassinated)
 King Zhaoxiang of Qin
 Zhao Sheng, Chinese chancellor of the Zhao State

References